Shahrak-e Dehnow (also known as Shahrak-e Dehnow-ye Moqīmī) is a village in Rostam-e Do Rural District, in the Central District of Rostam County, Fars Province, Iran. At the 2006 census, its population was 247, in 47 families.

References 

Populated places in Rostam County